Shane Bergman (born February 9, 1990) is a retired Canadian football offensive lineman who played in seven seasons for the Calgary Stampeders of the Canadian Football League (CFL). He is a two-time Grey Cup champion having won in 2014 and 2018 and was a CFL-All Star in 2019. He played CIS football at the University of Western Ontario and attended Waterford District High School in Waterford, Ontario.

Early years
Bergman played football for the Waterford District High School Wolves. He helped the team win a league championship in 2009.

College career
Bergman played CIS football for the Western Ontario Mustangs.

Professional career
Bergman was drafted by the Calgary Stampeders in the sixth round with the 48th pick in the 2013 CFL Draft. He signed with the Stampeders on May 21, 2013. He made his CFL debut on November 1, 2013 against the BC Lions. He started 14 games at left guard during the 2014 season.

In 2019, he was the Stampeders' Most Outstanding Offensive Lineman. He did not play in 2020 due to the cancellation of the 2020 CFL season and he announced his retirement on January 27, 2021.

References

External links
Just Sports Stats
Calgary Stampeders bio 

Living people
1990 births
Players of Canadian football from Ontario
Canadian football offensive linemen
Western Mustangs football players
Calgary Stampeders players
Sportspeople from Norfolk County, Ontario